Tzomborgha is the 10th full-length album by Ruins, released in 2002 by Magaibutsu Records in Japan and licensed to Ipecac Recordings for a US release. It is the final full-length album to feature Ruins as a two-piece. The Black Sabbath Medley also appears on the Temporary Residence Black Sabbath tribute album Everything Comes & Goes.

Track listing
All tracks written by Ruins.

 "Komnigriss" – 1:59
 "Skhanddraviza" – 3:57
 "Mennevuogth" – 4:06
 "Messiaen" – 2:18
 "Wanzhemvergg" – 5:00
 "Djubatczegromm" – 2:09
 "Zajyu" – 2:19
 "Issighirudoh" – 3:42
 "Muoljimbog" – 2:27
 "Gurthemvhail" – 2:50
 "Pachtseills" – 2:13
 "Chittam Irangaayo" – 5:37
 "Tzomborgha" – 5:35
 "Black Sabbath Medley Reversible" – 2:16
 "Mahavishnu Orchestra Medley" – 2:05

References

Ruins (Japanese band) albums
2002 albums
Ipecac Recordings albums